Cloudburst is a 1951 British crime drama film produced by Hammer Films, directed by Francis Searle, starring Robert Preston and featuring Elizabeth Sellars, Harold Lang, Colin Tapley and Sheila Burrell.  The script is based on a play written by Leo Marks, a wartime cryptographer for the Special Operations Executive, and later the author of a memoir about his wartime work, Between Silk and Cyanide (1998).

Plot
A World War II veteran, a former operative for the SOE, seeks revenge on the driver and passenger of a hit-and-run automobile that struck and killed his wife.

Cast
 Robert Preston as John Graham  
 Elizabeth Sellars as Carol Graham  
 Colin Tapley as Inspector Davis  
 Sheila Burrell as Lorna Dawson  
 Harold Lang as Mickie Fraser / Kid Python  
 Mary Germaine as Peggy Reece  
 George Woodbridge as Sergeant Ritchie  
 Lyn Evans as Chuck Peters  
 Thomas Heathcote as Jackie  
 Edith Sharpe as Mrs. Reece  
 Daphne Anderson as Kate  
 Edward Lexy as Cardew  
 James Mills as Thompson  
 Noel Howlett as Johnson  
 Martin Boddey as Desk Sergeant

References

External links
 
 
 

1951 crime drama films
1951 films
British black-and-white films
British crime drama films
British films about revenge
Film noir
Films directed by Francis Searle
Films set in England
Films set in London
Films set in the 1940s
Hammer Film Productions films
1950s English-language films
1950s British films